Internationale or variation, may refer to:

 The Internationale (1888 song), a French song, the left-wing anthem
 The Internationale (album), 1990 Billy Bragg album
 Internationale (EP), 1995 Braniac record
 Vivi l'internationale (1948–2022), Beninese singer

See also

 Political international or "internationale", a type of international political organization
 First Internationale
 Second Internationale
 La Troisième Internationale
 Internationalen
 Internationaler Bund
 
 International (disambiguation)